Maneri is a surname. Notable people with the surname include:

Joe Maneri (1927–2009), American jazz musician and composer
Mat Maneri (born 1969), American jazz musician and composer
Sharafuddin Maneri (1263–1381), Indian Sufi mystic (Patna, Bihar).
Steve Maneri (born 1988), American football player

See also
Maneri Dam, a dam in Uttarakhand, India
 Maneri, a habitation and railway station in Uttarakhand, India